Samantha Schmidt (born 10 October 2001) is an Australian Paralympic athlete. She represented  Australia at the 2020 Tokyo  Paralympics.

Early life
Samanatha Schmidt was born on 10 October 2001 to Gemina Moore and David Schmidt. Schmidt has cerebral palsy, and she is a proud Wakawaka and Gubbi Gubbi Indigenous woman. She attended Bundaberg State High School and lives in Bundaberg, Queensland.

Athletics career
Schmidt picked up a discus at the age of five and is classified as F38 thrower. She was the national champion for open women para discus and javelin in 2018, and she was chosen for the Tokyo 2020 Paralympic discus shadow squad in 2020.

In March 2021, Schmidt threw a personal best 33.66 m, setting a new national and Oceania record.

At the 2020 Tokyo Paralympics, she finished sixth in the Women's Discus F38 with a distance of 30:26. Schmidt is coached by Ralph Newton.

References

External links

Living people
2001 births
Australian female discus throwers
Paralympic athletes of Australia
Athletes (track and field) at the 2020 Summer Paralympics
Cerebral Palsy category Paralympic competitors
Track and field athletes with cerebral palsy
Indigenous Australian Paralympians
Sportspeople from Bundaberg